Josef Suk's Serenade for Strings in E flat major, Op. 6, was composed in 1892.

While Suk was studying under Antonín Dvořák at the Prague Conservatory, Dvořák noticed a melancholy strain in much of Suk's music, and recommended he try writing some lighter and more cheerful music.  Based on Dvořák's suggestion, Suk produced the Serenade for Strings.

Two movements were publicly conducted by Suk in late 1893 in Tábor.  The first complete performance was on 25 February 1895, at the Prague Conservatory, conducted by Antonín Bennewitz, Suk's violin teacher at the Conservatory.

The Serenade soon brought Suk considerable fame and Dvořák's longtime supporter, Johannes Brahms, endorsed its publication.

Structure 
The serenade comprises four movements:
 Andante con moto
 Allegro ma non troppo e grazioso
 Adagio
 Allegro giocoso, ma non troppo presto

References

External links

Compositions by Josef Suk
Serenades
Compositions for string orchestra
1892 compositions
Compositions in E-flat major